The Regroupement des militants syndicaux or RMS (in English: Trade-Union Militants Grouping) was a political organization founded in 1974 by members of the Groupe socialiste des travailleurs du Québec involved in the three main trade-unions in Quebec (FTQ, CSN and CEQ) to rally trade unionists into political action.

On the political scene, the RMS was deeply involved in the creation of a left-of-centre political party in Montreal, the Rassemblement des citoyens de Montréal (Montreal Citizens Movement) in 1974. It also initiated with the Nouveau Parti démocratique du Québec a coalition that contested seats in the 1976 Quebec general election.

The RMS ended its activities in 1981.

See also

 Coalition New Democratic Party of Quebec - Regroupement des militants syndicaux candidates, 1976 Quebec provincial election
 Politics of Quebec
 List of political parties in Canada#Quebec

External links
 National Assembly historical information
 La Politique québécoise sur le Web

Provincial political parties in Quebec
Socialist parties in Canada
Political parties established in 1974
Political parties disestablished in 1981
1974 establishments in Quebec
1981 disestablishments in Canada